The Glenfiddich Food and Drink Awards were intended to recognize achievements in writing, publishing and broadcasting on the subjects of food and drink. The awards had been sponsored since 1972 by William Grant & Sons, a family-owned Scottish distiller that produces Glenfiddich, a Speyside single malt Scotch whisky.

In total 12 awards were made annually.

In 2008, Glenfiddich decided to discontinue distributing Food and Drink Awards, reviewing their "strategy, scope and potential application in some of Glenfiddich’s key markets outside the UK".

See also
 Glenfiddich Spirit of Scotland Awards

External links
Glenfiddich website
Glenfiddich Food and Drink Awards official website

Awards established in 1972
Food and drink awards
British cuisine
Scottish awards